Mina Adamaki (Greek: Μίνα Αδαμάκη; 17 July 1944 – 11 November 2022) was a Greek actress.

Life and career 
Born in Volos, Adamaki graduated in law at the University of Athens and then studied acting at the TDrama School of the Karolos Koun Art Theatre. She also followed courses in puppetry and pantomime in London. 

She is best known for her role in the  Mega Channel TV-series Oi Treis Harites. 

Adamaki died after a long battle with cancer on 11 November 2022, at the age of 78.

References

External links  

 

1944 births
2022 deaths 
People from Volos
Greek film actresses
Greek television actresses
Greek stage actresses